The Women's 200 Breaststroke event at the 10th FINA World Aquatics Championships swam 24 – 25 July 2003 in Barcelona, Spain. Preliminary and semifinal heats swam on July 24, with the Final swum on July 25.

At the start of the event, the World (WR) and Championship (CR) records were:
WR: 2:22.99 swum by Hui Qi (China) on 13 April 2001 in Hangzhou, China.
CR: 2:24.90 swum by Ágnes Kovács (Hungary) on 25 July 2001 in Fukuoka, Japan

Results

Final

Semifinals

Preliminaries

References

Swimming at the 2003 World Aquatics Championships
2003 in women's swimming